Kim Kwang-Seok Fourth is the fourth and final eponymous studio album by South Korean singer-songwriter Kim Kwang-seok.

Track listing

Further reading 
 74th: Kim Kwang-Seok's "Kim Kwang-Seok Fourth" Kyunghyang Shinmun
 The Everlasting Singer Who Sang Poems Naver

1994 albums
Korean-language albums